Fios de ovos (literally "egg threads", also known as "angel hair" in English) is a traditional Portuguese sweet food made of eggs (chiefly yolks), drawn into thin strands and boiled in sugar syrup. They are a traditional element in Portuguese and Brazilian cuisine, both in desserts and as side dishes (only in Brazil).

This dish is called Letria in Goa, not to be confused with the vermicelli dessert made in Portugal.

The preparation is also known in Spain as Huevo hilado ("spun egg"), in Japan as Keiran Somen (鶏卵素麺, "hen's egg noodle"), in Cambodia as Vawee, in Malaysia as Jala mas ("golden net"), in Thailand as Foi Thong (ฝอยทอง; "golden strands"), and in the North Malabar region of Kerala, India as Muttamala (മുട്ടമാല; "egg lace").

History

Like other egg-based Portuguese sweets, fios de ovos is believed to have been created by Portuguese nuns around the 14th or 15th century. Laundry was a common service performed by convents and monasteries, and their use of egg whites for "starching" clothes created a large surplus of yolks.<ref>Marina Alves (2008), Dos deuses. Online article, Jornal da Pampulha, Belo Horizonte, accessed on July 5, 2009.</ref>  The recipe was probably taken to Japan and Thailand by Portuguese explorers between the 16th and 18th centuries.

Brazil

In Brazilian cuisine, fios de ovos is used to make the bolo Marta Rocha (named after Miss Brazil 1954, Martha Rocha), a layered cake made with alternating layers of vanilla and chocolate sponge, topped with whipped cream, fios de ovos and sometimes other toppings like maraschino cherries and nuts. It is used in a similar way as a decoration for torta de nozes, a layer cake made with walnut sponge filled with doce de ovos  (an egg custard), finished with meringue topping and fios de ovos.

ThailandFios de ovos is called Foi Thong in Thailand. The name of the dessert comes from the observation that it has fine, long stripes and is shiny like silk. It is considered a fine dessert. The word Thong (gold) has an auspicious connotation to Thai people. The long stripe is also seen as symbolizing a long life and undying love. Fios de ovos was introduced from Portugal to Thailand by Maria Guyomar de Pinha, sometimes considered the Queen of Thai desserts.

JapanKeiran Somen is the name of fios de ovos in Japan. The dessert is one of the nanbangashi, which are desserts introduced from Portugal during the Nanban trade.

Uses
In Portugal and Brazil, fios de ovos are often used in fillings, cake decorations and other desserts and accompaniments for sweet dishes. In Brazil, they are also used as accompaniments in savory dishes, often served with canned fruits alongside Christmas turkey.Terra Culinária, "Peru de Natal" . Accessed on July 7, 2009.

See also
 Egg garnish
 Papo de anjo Quindim''
 List of Brazilian sweets and desserts

References

Brazilian cuisine
Thai desserts and snacks
Wagashi
Portuguese desserts
Christmas food
Egg dishes